{{DISPLAYTITLE:C41H30O26}}
The molecular formula C41H30O26 (molar mass: 938.66 g/mol, exact mass: 938.102531 u) may refer to:
 Nupharin A, an ellagitannin
 Punicafolin, an ellagitannin
 Tellimagrandin II, an ellagitannin